John Michael Olson (born August 28, 1969) is a United States Air Force major general who serves as the mobilization assistant to the chief of space operations and chief data and artificial intelligence officer of the Department of the Air Force.

In July 2022, Olson was nominated for promotion to major general.

References

External links
 

Year of birth missing (living people)
Living people
Place of birth missing (living people)
United States Air Force generals